Lee Hyun-Seung (born December 14, 1988) is a South Korean football player who currently plays for Bucheon FC.

On 17 January 2011, Lee Hyun-Seung joined Chunnam Dragons on loan from FC Seoul for 1 year and signed a permanent deal after his loan stint.

Club career statistics

External links
 
 FIFA Player Statistics

1988 births
Living people
Association football wingers
South Korean footballers
Jeonbuk Hyundai Motors players
FC Seoul players
Jeonnam Dragons players
Bucheon FC 1995 players
Daejeon Hana Citizen FC players
Ansan Mugunghwa FC players
K League 1 players
K League 2 players
People from Suwon
Sportspeople from Gyeonggi Province